Meadow Lake Airport  is located  west of Meadow Lake, Saskatchewan, Canada.

See also 
 List of airports in Saskatchewan

References

External links 

Certified airports in Saskatchewan
Meadow Lake No. 588, Saskatchewan
Meadow Lake, Saskatchewan